Clog dancing is dancing whilst wearing clogs.  The rigid nature of the clogs and their percussive sound when dancing on a hard surface has given rise to a number of distinct styles, including the following:

Dance
 Clog dancing, a Welsh and Northern English step dance danced in clogs.
 Clogging, an American style which is not necessarily danced in clogs.
 Klompendansen, a Dutch style of dance.
 Morris dance, sometimes danced in clogs.
 Tap dance, which developed in part out of clog dancing.

Music
Clog Dance: The Very Best of Violinski A compilation album by Violinski 
Clog Dance (song) by Violinski 

Clogs (shoes)
Dances